Ian Wilson (born 19 December 1970) is a retired long-distance freestyle swimmer from Great Britain.

Swimming career
He represented his native country at the 1992 Summer Olympics in Barcelona, Spain. There he finished in fifth place in the men's 1500-metre freestyle event. The previous year he won the silver medal at the 1991 European Long Course Championships in the same event.

He represented England in the 400 metres and 1,500 freestyle events, at the 1990 Commonwealth Games in Auckland, New Zealand. Four years later he competed in the 1,500 metres freestyle during the 1994 Commonwealth Games and then took part in a third Games when he swam once again in the 1,500 metres freestyle at the 1998 Commonwealth Games. He also won the ASA National Championship in the 1500 metres freestyle on six occasions (1990, 1991, 1992, 1994, 1995, 1996)  and also won the 400 metres freestyle title in 1995 and 1996.

References

English male freestyle swimmers
Swimmers at the 1992 Summer Olympics
Olympic swimmers of Great Britain
1970 births
Living people
Place of birth missing (living people)
Medalists at the FINA World Swimming Championships (25 m)
European Aquatics Championships medalists in swimming
Universiade medalists in swimming
Universiade gold medalists for Great Britain
Swimmers at the 1990 Commonwealth Games
Swimmers at the 1994 Commonwealth Games
Swimmers at the 1998 Commonwealth Games
Medalists at the 1991 Summer Universiade
Commonwealth Games competitors for England